Antelope was a West Indian packet ship launched in 1780. The French captured her in 1781, 1782, and finally, in 1794. She is most famous for a desperate single-ship action in 1793 when her crew captured a better-armed French privateer with a much larger crew.

Career
The French first captured her in 1781, and then ransomed her. They then captured her again on 10 October 1782. They took her into Nantes, from where Captain William Kempthorne re-purchased her on 4 April 1783, and took her under command.

On 1 December 1793, Antelope was sailing without Captain Kempthorne, who had remained in Falmouth due to illness, and was off Cumberland Harbour, Cuba when she sighted two privateers. Obeying orders, Antelope headed back to port to avoid trouble, but the next day the wind failed and one of the privateers, Atlante (of eight 3-pounder guns), was able to come alongside and attack. Antelope was armed with six 3-pounder (1.4 kg) guns and manned by a crew of 21. Atlante, a French privateer from Charleston, South Carolina, had a crew of 65, consisting of Frenchmen, Irishmen, and Americans.

During the battle, both of Antelopes officers were killed or wounded. Before he fell, the master, Mr. Edward Curtis, turned the two bow guns, double shotted, to cover the bow, and fired them at the first boarding party, killing and wounding some 15 men; he fell shortly thereafter. Command fell on Boatswain John Pascoe, who then led the crew in repelling the boarding parties. Antelopes crew repeatedly threw back the privateers, and eventually cut their grapples. In their resistance, Antelopes crew was aided by the fact that she was higher than the Atlante, enabling the crew to fire down on the deck of the privateer while being protected. Not content with having repelled the attacks, Pascoe raced up the rigging, lashing the squaresail yard of Atlante to Antelopes foreshrouds, and continued the battle until Atlante surrendered.

Antelope lost 3 killed and 3 wounded, one mortally. The privateer lost her first captain mortally wounded and second captain wounded, 30 men killed in the action, and 17 wounded (three mortally); only 16 of her 65 men were unhurt.

The victorious Antelope put into Annotto Bay, Jamaica with her prize. It turned out that Atlante had been out of Charlestown a month, during which time she had taken one prize, a Bermudian brig.

Jamaica's House of Assembly voted a sum of 500 guineas to the officers and men of Antelope. Two hundred guineas went to the widow of Mr. Curtis, the late master. One hundred guineas each went to the first mate, who had been shot through the body during the engagement, and to Mr. Pascoe, the boatswain. The last hundred guineas was divided among the surviving members of the crew. In London, the Committee for Encouraging the Capture of French Privateers too passed out lavish rewards. Pascoe received 50 guineas and a gold whistle; the crew, widows, and dependents received money. The Postmaster General of the United Kingdom, the Earl of Chesterfield too presented prizes but "stressed that this was an award made solely due to the lengthy defence and successful protection of the mail. He did not want to encourage crews to actively seek prize money or ships. Their duty was to the safe and swift delivery of the post."

Fate
On 19 August 1794, Antelope sailed for North America with thirty men.  On 19 September 1794, she encountered a squadron of French frigates in a dense fog.  Her crew sank the mail and surrendered to Surveillante. While a captive of the French, Captain Kempthorne died of yellow fever. Antelopes assessed value when lost was £2750 16s 8d (plus £34 for her ordnance stores).

Notes, citations, and references
Notes

Citations

References
 Anonymous (1895) History of the post-office packet service between the years 1793-1815. (Macmillan and Co.). 
 Campbell, John, John Berkenhout and Henry Redhead Yorke (1817) Lives of the British admirals: containing also a new and accurate naval history, from the earliest periods. (C. J. Barrinton).
 Cust, Edward (1859) Annals of the wars of the eighteenth century, compiled from the most authentic histories of the period: 1783-1795. (Mitchell's Military Library).
Robinson, Howard (1964) Carrying British mails overseas. (London : G. Allen & Unwin).

External links
 His Majesty's packet ship Antelope - mention in Royal Gazette 25 May 1793

Age of Sail ships of England
1780 ships
Captured ships
Age of Sail merchant ships
Merchant ships of the United Kingdom
Falmouth Packets